Elena Angela Verdugo (April 20, 1925 – May 30, 2017) was an American actress who began in films at the age of five in Cavalier of the West (1931). Her career in radio, television and film spanned six decades.

Early life 
Elena Angela Verdugo was born on April 20, 1925, in the city of Paso Robles, California. She was the daughter of Mrs. Beatrice K. Verdugo. Verdugo studied dance, drama, and music as a youngster.

Career

Film
When Verdugo was 15, a judge appointed her mother as her legal guardian so that she could sign a film contract. One of her early appearances was in Down Argentine Way (1940). She made numerous film appearances through the 1940s, including two Universal horror films. While filming the Abbott and Costello comedy Little Giant (1946), she met and married screenwriter Charles R. Marion, who also wrote for the comedy team's radio show.

Verdugo starred with Gene Autry and Stephen Dunne in The Big Sombrero (1949). She had a small part as the orange girl smitten by Cyrano's gallantry in the opening theater scene of the 1950 José Ferrer version of Cyrano de Bergerac.

She co-starred in Thief of Damascus (1952) with Paul Henreid and John Sutton.

Verdugo had a starring role as a singer in 1957's Panama Sal, a musical comedy film.

Radio and television 

Verdugo had a flair for comedy, and she garnered much laughter and applause in the title role of the hit situation comedy Meet Millie on both radio and television (1952–1956).
She guest starred on The Bob Cummings Show in a 1958 episode titled "Bob and the Ravishing Realtor", playing the part of the realtor. In 1959, she played Maria Carroyo in "Incident at Spanish Rock", an episode of Rawhide.

In May 1964 Verdugo appeared in a Season One episode of Petticoat Junction.  She played business executive Mary Jane Hastings who returns to Hooterville to accept an achievement award, but treats the men of the town—and her smitten male assistant—shabbily.

Verdugo is perhaps best known today for her role as office assistant/nurse Consuelo Lopez in the ABC series Marcus Welby, M.D., starring with Robert Young in the title role and James Brolin as the medical associate. The series aired from 1969 to 1976.

Recognition
In 1971 and 1972, Verdugo was nominated for Emmy Awards in the Outstanding Performance by an Actress in a Supporting Role in Drama category. Both nominations were for her performances on Marcus Welby, M.D.

She has a star at 1709 Vine Street in the Television section of the Hollywood Walk of Fame. It was dedicated on February 8, 1960.

Personal life
Verdugo is a descendant of Jose Maria Verdugo, a Spanish soldier and recipient of the Rancho San Rafael, a land grant which included what is today the cities of Glendale, Burbank, La Crescenta, La Canada and the Los Angeles neighborhoods of Atwater and Eagle Rock.

Verdugo and Marion had one son, Richard Marion (1949–1999), who became an actor/director. Her second husband was Charles "Rosy" Rosewall, M.D., a psychiatrist, who died in 2012.

Verdugo died on May 30, 2017 in Los Angeles at the age of 92.

Filmography

References

External links

Elena Verdugo discusses the Internet in handwritten letter (5/2/2002)

1925 births
2017 deaths
American film actresses
American radio actresses
American television actresses
American people of Spanish descent
Actresses from California
People from Paso Robles, California
20th-century American actresses
21st-century American women